Yoon Bit-garam (or  ; born 7 May 1990) is a South Korean professional association football player.

Club career 
Yoon created the most chances among participants of the 2020 AFC Champions League, leading Ulsan Hyundai to the title. He was recognized for his performance, winning the Champions League MVP award.

International career
In the 2011 AFC Asian Cup, Yoon came on as a substitute against Iran in the quarter-final at the Qatar Sports Club Stadium. His extra-time goal ensured that South Korea defeated Iran and progressed to the semi-finals against Japan.

Yoon scored against Petr Čech with a free kick in a 2–1 friendly victory over Czech Republic on 5 June 2016.

Career statistics

Club

International
Results list South Korea's goal tally first.

Honours
Ulsan Hyundai
AFC Champions League: 2020
Korean FA Cup runner-up: 2020

South Korea U23
Asian Games bronze medal: 2010

South Korea
AFC Asian Cup third place: 2011

Individual
K League 1 Best XI: 2010, 2011
K League Rookie of the Year: 2010
Korean FA Goal of the Year: 2011
AFC Champions League Most Valuable Player: 2020
AFC Champions League All-Star Squad: 2020, 2021
AFC Champions League Opta Best XI: 2020

Notes

References

External links 
 
 
 
　

1990 births
Living people
Association football midfielders
South Korean footballers
South Korea international footballers
2011 AFC Asian Cup players
Gyeongnam FC players
Seongnam FC players
Jeju United FC players
Ulsan Hyundai FC players
Yanbian Funde F.C. players
K League 1 players
Chinese Super League players
Chung-Ang University alumni
Asian Games medalists in football
Footballers at the 2010 Asian Games
Expatriate footballers in China
South Korean expatriate sportspeople in China
Asian Games bronze medalists for South Korea
Medalists at the 2010 Asian Games
People from Changwon
Sportspeople from South Gyeongsang Province